Ronnie Lombard (born 28 July 1928) was a South African gymnast. He competed at the 1952 Summer Olympics and the 1956 Summer Olympics.

References

External links
 

1928 births
Possibly living people
South African male artistic gymnasts
Olympic gymnasts of South Africa
Gymnasts at the 1952 Summer Olympics
Gymnasts at the 1956 Summer Olympics
Place of birth missing